Teilhet is a surname. Notable people with the surname include:

Darwin Teilhet (1904–1964), American mystery novelist, advertising executive, journalist, and film screenwriter
Rob Teilhet, American politician